The Knickerbocker Hotel is a hotel at Times Square, on the southeastern corner of Broadway and 42nd Street, in the Midtown Manhattan neighborhood of New York City. Built by John Jacob Astor IV, the hostelry was designed in 1901 and opened in 1906. Its location near the Theater District around Times Square was intended to attract not only residential guests but also theater visitors.

The Knickerbocker Hotel is largely designed in the Beaux-Arts style by Marvin & Davis, with Bruce Price as consultant. Its primary frontages are on Broadway and 42nd Street. These facades are constructed of red brick with terracotta details and a prominent mansard roof. The Knickerbocker Hotel also incorporates an annex on 41st Street, built in 1894 as part of the St. Cloud Hotel, which formerly occupied the site. The 41st Street facade contains a Romanesque Revival design by Philip C. Brown. Inside, the hotel contains 300 rooms, a restaurant, a coffee shop, and a roof bar. The original interior  design was devised in 1905 by Trowbridge & Livingston. There are scattered remnants of the original interior design, including an entrance that formerly led from the New York City Subway's Times Square station to the hotel's basement.

The original hotel, which served as the home of Enrico Caruso and George M. Cohan, shuttered in 1920 following a decrease in business. The building was then converted to offices, becoming known as the Knickerbocker Building. It was the home of Newsweek magazine from 1940 to 1959 during which it was called the Newsweek Building. After major renovations in 1980, it became known as 1466 Broadway and was used as garment showrooms and offices. Following another renovation in 2001, it was known as 6 Times Square. The Knickerbocker was added to the National Register of Historic Places in 1980 and was designated a New York City Landmark in 1988. It was converted back to a hotel from 2013 to 2015 under its original name.

Site 
The Knickerbocker Hotel is on the southeastern corner of Broadway and 42nd Street, at the south end of Times Square, in the Midtown Manhattan neighborhood of New York City. It contains the alternate addresses 1462–1470 Broadway, 6 Times Square, and 142 West 42nd Street, with a small annex extending south to 143 West 41st Street.

The Knickerbocker Hotel wraps around 8 Times Square at the corner of Broadway and 41st Street. The site is adjacent to 5 Times Square and Times Square Tower to the west, One Times Square to the northwest, 4 Times Square to the north, the Bank of America Tower to the northeast, and the Bush Tower to the east.

The site was previously occupied by the Hotel St. Cloud, which opened in 1868 at Broadway and 42nd Street. At the time, it was relatively far from the developed portions of Manhattan. Grand Central Depot, predecessor of Grand Central Terminal, was developed nearby in 1871, resulting in the growth of the surrounding neighborhood. In 1892, John Jacob Astor IV acquired the lease of the Hotel St. Cloud for $850,000. With transit improvements in the late 19th and early 20th centuries, New York City's theater district relocated  from further south in Manhattan to modern-day Times Square. The construction of theaters led to the development of other entertainment facilities such as hotels, dance halls, and restaurants. Furthermore, the Knickerbocker site was adjacent to the city's first subway line, providing access from the rest of the city.

Architecture 
The Knickerbocker Hotel, completed in 1906, was designed by Marvin & Davis with consulting architect Bruce Price. The structure was largely designed in the Beaux-Arts style. The annex on 143 West 41st Street, which was built in 1894 as an addition to the Hotel St. Cloud, contains a Romanesque Revival facade designed by Philip C. Brown. The 41st Street annex was intentionally incorporated into the current hotel building. The interiors were designed by Trowbridge & Livingston.

Facade

Broadway and 42nd Street 

The Knickerbocker Hotel's Broadway and 42nd Street facades are articulated into three horizontal sections: a two-story base, a ten-story shaft, and a three-story mansard roof. The ground and second stories serve as a commercial base and have seen numerous design changes since 1920. The vertical limestone piers are the only portions of the original design that remain at the base. Originally, a ground-level portico projected from the center seven bays of the 42nd Street facade, with seven round arches topped by a balustrade. This portico was removed by 1911. There was a similar portico at the center five bays on Broadway, which was flush with the rest of the facade. The second floor contained round-arched windows. The Broadway facade originally contained a secondary entrance to the cafe.

On the third through twelfth floors, the building is clad in red brick with decorative elements made of Indiana Limestone and terracotta. Some of the limestone and terracotta ornamentation has been replaced with similar-looking concrete. Along 42nd Street, the outermost four bays are grouped into slightly projecting "corner pavilions", flanking the center seven bays. The two center bays on each corner pavilion are paired. The Broadway facade is nine bays wide and lacks projecting corner pavilions. Each window is flanked by stone quoins. The fourth, sixth, seventh, and eleventh-story windows contain either decorative iron balcony rails or stone balustrades. The pediments atop windows on each story are variously made of segmental arches, sculptured decorations, or swans' necks.

A small cornice runs above the fourth story, while more substantial cornices run above the ninth and eleventh stories. At Broadway, the center bay contains an arched pediment above the fourth-story window that interrupts the cornice above it. The ninth story cornice is supported by decorative brackets while the eleventh story cornice is supported by modillions. All three cornices have lost some of their original decorative elements.

The thirteenth through fifteenth stories are part of the mansard roof, which is clad in green copper. There are also urns at the corners of the roof. Originally, the dormer windows from the mansard roof contained elaborate pediments, although these were likely removed by 1920. The thirteenth floor windows' pediments were either triangular or segmentally arched. The fourteenth floor windows' pediments were round-arched. A penthouse on the fifteenth floor was added between 1908 and 1910 to designs by C. H. Cullen.

41st Street 

The 41st Street facade of the Knickerbocker Hotel is eight stories tall and is designed in the Romanesque Revival style, with some ornament in the Beaux-Arts style. The facade is made of buff brick and terracotta. It was intended as a service entrance to the main Knickerbocker Hotel.

The annex previously contained a second story with three bays of windows, above which runs a classical-style cornice. When the Knickerbocker was re-converted back into a hotel in the 2010s, the double-height first story was altered for a service entrance that takes up the entire width of the 41st Street facade. The third floor was skipped. The fourth and fifth stories are topped by an arch that spans the entire width of the annex. The sixth through eighth stories are flanked by pilasters, with two bays each on the sixth and seventh stories and three bays on the eighth stories. The attic, on the ninth story, was constructed in 1906 and contains two dormer windows with triangular copper pediments.

Features 
The modern Knickerbocker Hotel contains 330 guestrooms. Twenty-seven of the rooms are advertised as junior suites while four are labeled as signature suites. The modern Knickerbocker Hotel also contains a restaurant, a coffee shop, and a roof bar overlooking Times Square.

The first Hotel Knickerbocker originally had 556 guestrooms, 400 of which contained baths. The Knickerbocker was described in Architects and Builders Magazine as having "magnificent equipment and excellent service". The Knickerbocker's various artworks were a prominent part of the original interior design, having been installed as a way to enhance the interior character at a relatively low cost. A critic for the Architectural Record praised the interior design, saying: "There are few hotels in the country in the appearance of which such uniform good taste has been displayed", although the same critic took issue with the interior layout. Connecting the various floors were four passenger elevators and four freight and service elevators. The original hotel even had five hundred clocks, which were made in Paris and maintained by an employee who was specifically tasked with winding them each day.

Little evidence remains of the original design, particularly after the first version of the hotel had been converted into an office building in 1920. On the upper stories, the only remnants of the original design were radiators and terrazzo floors.

Basements 

Below the lobby is a basement and subbasement, which retain their wall paneling, herringbone-patterned floors, and hexagonal white tile decorations. The basement had a grillroom, bar, broker's office, barber and manicure parlors, and the kitchen. The grillroom contained an English design with plain oak walls and a Gothic oak ceiling. Displayed in the basement bar was a Frederic Remington painting entitled "The United States Cavalry Charge". The kitchen had refrigerating plants, heating plants, and glass and silver chests, accessed by four dumbwaiters from the kitchen.

The subbasement contained the mechanical plant with boilers, coal storage bins, electrical generators, water filters, an ice-making plant, and an engine room. The wine vault, cigar vault, baggage room, and laundry facility were also in the subbasement.

At the time of the hotel's opening in 1906, the hotel's management advertised two direct subway entrances from the Times Square station, with one entrance intended for ladies. One doorway still exists on the platform adjacent to the 42nd Street Shuttle's track 1, topped by a lintel containing the carved word "Knickerbocker". Before the station opened as part of the city's first subway line in 1904, John Jacob Astor IV had given permission for the subway to be constructed through part of his property only if the station included a hotel entrance. The hotel entrance was rearranged when the platform was lengthened in 1909. While the entrance was closed after the original iteration of the hotel was shuttered, the passageway to the entrance has retained much of its ornamentation, such as painted roundels. In 2019, as part of the remodeling of the modern shuttle station, the damaged Knickerbocker marble lintel was to be replaced with a replica. The modern doorway leads to a subway manhole with mechanical equipment rather than to the Knickerbocker's basement.

Ground and second stories 

The original design had a lobby facing 42nd Street, with marble columns, bronze pendant lanterns, and red-and-gold foyer decorations. The lobby had a statue of Father Knickerbocker, a political-cartoon personification of New York City. Leading off the lobby were safe deposit boxes, and a bookstand and ticket office. The cafe west of the lobby had white and gold decorations. An "L"-shaped restaurant, with a flower room. ran east and south of the lobby. It had a Caen stone cladding; a  beamed ceiling modeled after the Palace of Fontainebleau; marble statues and tapestries on the walls; and two bronze-and-marble electric fountains by Frederick MacMonnies. Hung in the Flower Room was the mural "Masque of Flowers".

The second floor was devoted to dining rooms in the original design. The ballroom had hardwood floors; copies of old portraits on the walls; and white, blue, and silver decorations. The adjoining foyer had satin velvet decoration with gold-painted pillars and a gold-leaf ornamented ceiling. There was also a nurse's hall and eight private dining rooms on that story, including a "gold room" with gold cutlery for 48 guests.

During the 1920 alterations, the lobby spaces were removed, but a pink marble-clad elevator lobby was added on the ground floor. The lowest two stories were also converted to a retail condominium. Remnants from the original design include a vaulted ceiling above the elevator lobby, decorated with rosettes, but hidden above a dropped ceiling. When the hotel reopened in 2015, Charlie Palmer was hired to operate Jake's @ The Knick, a "grab-and-go" takeout eatery on the ground level. The rebuilt ground floor has a  vaulted ceiling with decorative tiles similar to those installed in the subway.

Upper stories 

The third through fifteenth stories were originally devoted to residences and suites. The original third story contained suites, a ballroom, and a musician's gallery. The fourth through twelfth stories were designed nearly identically, while the thirteenth and fourteenth stories were slightly different in arrangement. The fifteenth story also contained a large women's dormitory and sitting room, a valet's room, a linen room, a bundle laundry room, a fan ventilator, and a storage and upholstery department. As floor number 13 is skipped, the thirteenth story is actually labeled as floor 14.

During much of the 20th century, these stories were used as office space, but by 2015 these stories were converted back to hotel suites. The fourth floor of the reconverted hotel contains Charlie Palmer at the Knick, a 100-seat full-service restaurant. The bar, named after the former hotel on the same site, is used for viewings of the Times Square Ball drop, which takes place at the neighboring One Times Square during New Year's Eve.

History

Original hotel

Construction 
In 1901, the New York City Department of Buildings received plans for three hotels, one theater, and fourteen apartment buildings on Times Square. Among those plans was a 14-story hotel designed by Bruce Price and Martin & Davis, to be built on the site of the St. Cloud Hotel at Broadway and 42nd Street. The new hotel, known as the Knickerbocker, was intended as a rival to the Hotel Astor, also owned by the Astor family. The Knickerbocker was to be a Renaissance Revival hotel with a similar arrangement to other hotels of the time. In addition to service facilities across two basement levels and dining and banquet facilities on the first and second floors, the Hotel Knickerbocker was planned with 600 suites and 300 baths. At the time, the section of Broadway between 34th and 42nd Streets was quickly being developed with theaters and hotels. Consequently, the Hotel Knickerbocker's construction spurred the development of other hostelries nearby.

John Jacob Astor IV leased the hotel to the International Realty and Construction Company (IRCC) of Philadelphia, organized by J.E. and A.L. Pennock. Astor stipulated that the hotel had to be completed for at least $2 million. The IRCC received the contract for the hotel's construction in December 1901, and Astor loaned $1.65 million to the IRCC in March 1902. Under the IRCC, the project began in 1901 or 1902. Under the contract between Astor and the IRCC, Astor reserved the right to name the hotel operator when it was complete. James B. Regan, former manager of the adjacent Pabst Hotel, leased the site from the IRCC for seventeen years in July 1902. Regan had formed the Knickerbocker Hotel Company (KHC), serving as the KHC's managing director with Jesse Lewisohn and Godfrey Hyams as co-directors. Astor contracted Regan to be the hotel's manager when it was finished, but Regan resigned from the KHC over disputes with the other directors.

In February 1904, just as the facade and steel skeleton was completed, construction was halted after the IRCC defaulted on its payments. Contractually, the IRCC was given a year to repay its outstanding obligations should it choose to resume construction. In the meantime, Astor commissioned new plans for the interior design. During this time, the only revenue from the Hotel Knickerbocker was coming from the billboards around it. At the time, the public did not know why work had stopped. The IRCC never returned to the project and, in May 1905, Astor hired Trowbridge & Livingston to complete the interiors, with work resuming the following month. Regan also agreed to lease the hotel for twenty years at $300,000 per year. The new plans cost $1 million more than the original proposal and included an additional story. Part of the third story was demolished to make way for the double-story ballroom. The 42nd Street facade was also modified to include a portico.

Operation 

The Knickerbocker opened to private guests on October 23, 1906, and to the general public the following day. At the time of the hotel's opening, a room for one person averaged about $3.25 per day, while suites cost about $15–20 per day. The hotel quickly became part of the city's social scene. One week after the hotel's opening, it was receiving an influx of guests from the subway. By early 1907, Architectural Record said the hotel "has proved to be a huge popular success". Architectural historian Robert A. M. Stern wrote the Hotel Knickerbocker, along with the nearby Astor and Rector hotels, "created something of an architectural ensemble clustered around Times Square".

The Armenonville restaurant, a 600-seat cafe on the ground floor, opened in June 1908. The 42nd Street frontage was slightly rebuilt two years later when 42nd Street was widened, and the Armenonville restaurant was renovated. Also in 1911, the Knickerbocker expanded into the neighboring Ryan Hotel, adding about one hundred more suites. After John Jacob Astor IV died on the Titanic in 1912, his son Vincent Astor inherited the hotel, which continued to run successfully under James B. Regan.

The Hotel Knickerbocker's residents included Metropolitan Opera singer Enrico Caruso, who took up a suite on half a story because of the hotel's proximity to the Metropolitan Opera House. When the end of World War I was falsely announced on November 8, 1918, Caruso led the crowd outside his suite in singing "The Star-Spangled Banner"; he repeated the performance on Armistice Day three days later, when the war actually ended. The actor and composer George M. Cohan also lived there. Other guests and residents included opera singer Geraldine Farrar, baritone Antonio Scotti, film director and producer D. W. Griffith, novelist F. Scott Fitzgerald, as well as numerous politicians and diplomats. The Tammany Hall political organization often held its meetings at the Hotel Knickerbocker, and media magnate William Randolph Hearst launched his failed campaign for the 1909 New York City mayoral election at the Knickerbocker.

The popular hotel bar gained the nickname "The 42nd Street Country Club". According to a legend, the martini was invented at the Knickerbocker in 1912 by Martini di Arma di Taggia, a hotel bartender who mixed dry vermouth and gin for John D. Rockefeller. The legend was subsequently debunked as having originated from a 1972 book by John Doxat. The Hotel Knickerbocker was also rumored to be where the velvet rope line was invented. During dinnertime, staff used a red velvet rope to create a queue, then handed out plates to guests waiting outside. During Easter celebrations, the hotel's chef put live chicks in sugar eggs, and guests would dine while the chicks hatched onto the table.

The Hotel Knickerbocker was also the site of some high-profile incidents during its history. For instance, a chimpanzee dressed in human clothing walked into the lobby in 1918, prompting a panic. The next year, two men stole gems from a guest and attempted to escape through the basement, squirting tabasco sauce into the eyes of the responding patrolmen, who arrested the burglars anyway. There were also several murders at the Knickerbocker, including in 1912, when the hotel's in-house violinist Albert de Brahms killed his wife and tried to seal her body in plaster.

Office use 

The enactment of Prohibition in 1919 resulted in a marked decline in business at the Knickerbocker's restaurants and bars. By late 1919, Regan had given over operation of the hotel to his son, James E. Regan Jr., though the senior Regan retained the lease. In May 1920, the junior Regan announced the hotel would be closed at the end of the month and converted to an office building. Although the senior Regan's lease had more than fifteen years left to run, he surrendered it to Vincent Astor. At the time, the residents included James Regan Jr. and his wife Alice Joyce, as well as Caruso and his family. Immediately upon the announcement of the hotel's closure, several commercial tenants made bids for space in the Hotel Knickerbocker, and some applicants sought the entire building. At the time, the surrounding section of Broadway was quickly being developed for commercial purposes. The Hotel Knickerbocker closed on May 28, 1920.

1920s to 1960s 
Vincent Astor, Nicholas Biddle, and S. B. Thorn formed the Knickerbocker Holding Company on June 14, 1920, two weeks after the hotel's closure. The Bank for Savings loaned the company $3 million in October 1920 for the conversion of the old Hotel Knickerbocker into an office building. Astor hired architect Charles A. Platt to design the office conversion. The hotel interiors were completely gutted and the ground level was converted to fourteen storefronts. The walls of the old suites were moved or removed. The grill room in the basement was leased in December 1920 and continued to operate after the hotel's closure. The Old King Cole painting was loaned to the Racquet and Tennis Club on Park Avenue by 1925 before being installed permanently at the St. Regis Hotel in 1935.

By early 1921, the old Hotel Knickerbocker had become known as the Knickerbocker Building. While the storefront at the corner of Broadway and 42nd Street was quickly leased to a location of the National Drug Stores Corporation, the rest of the first floor was not leased until 1924, when it became a clothing store. The New York Society of Model Engineers' main room in the Knickerbocker Building housed a model train exhibition each year during the early 1930s. Other tenants included advertising firms, attorneys, and insurance companies. Over the years, the Knickerbocker Building's former function as a hotel was forgotten by the public; the name "Knickerbocker Hotel" even became associated with another subsequently shuttered hotel on 45th Street.

When the Knickerbocker Building became the headquarters of Newsweek magazine in October 1940, it was renamed the Newsweek Building. Also in the 1940s, an employment agency and art office. The Ryan Hotel structure at 140 West 42nd Street, which had been part of the original Knickerbocker Hotel but not the subsequent office building, was sold in 1944 to an investor who intended to modify that structure heavily. Vincent Astor continued to own the Newsweek Building until 1957, until it was sold to a client of Bernard H. Kayden. The underlying land was simultaneously sold to Massachusetts Mutual Life Insurance, a subsidiary of Harry Helmsley's Helmsley-Spear company and Irving S. Wolper, for $2.75 million. In early 1959, Newsweek signed a lease for space on 444 Madison Avenue, with plans to move out of the Knickerbocker during the beginning of that May.

1970s to 2000s 
By the mid-1970s, the building was known as 150–152 West 42nd Street and 1462–1470 Broadway. Helmsley still operated the building, which contained offices, commercial shops, and a pornographic bookstore. The land was held by the Inch Corporation, a shell company representing the true owner, the British royal family. Helmsley announced that he would drop his ownership of the Knickerbocker Building in 1975, raising concerns that the building would be demolished. Instead, the building deed was sold for a nominal sum of $1, despite the building being valued at $4.5 million.

In 1979, with the office market in a slump, Helmsley, David Baldwin, and Jack Vickers were planning to convert the office building to residential lofts. As part of the project, Helmsley, Baldwin, and Vickers were to relocate the building's main entrance from 152 West 42nd Street to 1466 Broadway, constructing a new lobby on Broadway. Libby, Ross & Whitehouse designed the new lobby and converted the interior to 113 units. Stores and commercial space would have been on the lowest four stories while the other stories would have been residential lofts. The commercial market quickly recovered and the space was instead rented as showrooms and studios for companies in the Garment District. The building was listed on the National Register of Historic Places on April 11, 1980, and the New York City Landmarks Preservation Commission designated the Knickerbocker Building as a landmark on October 18, 1988.

SL Green bought 1466 Broadway, along with several other Manhattan buildings owned by the Helmsley estate, in 1998 for $165 million. SL Green began renovating the building shortly afterward, in March 1999. At the time, the building contained a three-story location of The Gap at ground level; The Gap's billboards were prominently displayed on the facade. The Gap expanded its ground floor space from  during this time, reopening in mid-2001. SL Green sought to attract small office tenants to the top seven floors, so the company decided in late 2001 to rebrand the building as 6 Times Square, which it believed was a more prominent address. The facade was restored and the mansard roof was coated with greenish copper. Due to the complexities of the renovation, its costs increased to three times the original budget, and the renovation was completed in March 2003, three and a half years later than originally scheduled.

Reuse as hotel 

In 2004, SL Green sold 6 Times Square to Sitt Asset Management for $160 million. Sitt sold the building in 2006 to Istithmar Hotels, an investment group from the royal family of Dubai, for $300 million. Istithmar announced plans to convert the building back into a five-star hotel with between 250 and 300 rooms. However, by late 2009, Istithmar was unable to fulfill its debt obligation. Istithmar surrendered the property to its lender, Danske Bank, in March 2010. Danske subsequently resold the building to a joint venture of Highgate Holdings, Ashkenazy Acquisitions, and Stanley Chera.

FelCor Lodging Trust, a Texas real estate investment trust, acquired a 95 percent stake in the third through sixteenth floors for $109 million. The purchase took place in late 2011, although the acquisition was not announced until February 2012. The retail condominium on the first two floors was still owned by Ashkenazy. FelCor renovated the property for an additional $115 million, completely gutting it, with the exception of the facade. The hotel's new interior was designed by architecture and interior design firm Gabellini Sheppard Associates, with Peter Poon Architects as the architect of record. The new design was intended to both evoke the original hotel and represent Times Square's 21st-century revival. In a gesture to the hotel's history, the four signature suites were named the Caruso, Cohan, Martini, and Parrish suites, after prominent personalities of the old hotel.

The hotel reopened on February 12, 2015, as the Knickerbocker Hotel. The rooftop bar, the St. Cloud, opened in June 2015. The old subway entrance in the basement remained shuttered, and several of the original hotel's works of art, such as Old King Cole, were not restored in the renovated Knickerbocker Hotel. The ground level of the Knickerbocker Hotel building continued to house commercial uses, such as one of the last-ever locations of Toys "R" Us, which operated as a pop-up location in 2017 and 2018.

Critical reception
After the Knickerbocker Hotel reopened in 2015, it received mixed reviews. A critic for British newspaper The Daily Telegraph gave the Knickerbocker a 7/10 rating, saying that the hotel "adds a pinch of sophistication to Times Square. Yet, with its sleek, low-slung furnishings and neutral palette, the interiors are the antithesis of Beaux Arts, and Bellhops in baggy knickerbockers and chunky Doc Martens set the tone the moment you arrive." A reviewer for Oyster.com also contrasted the hotel's Renaissance-style interior and modern interior, saying: "Some guests find this minimalist style cold and uninviting, especially paired with the lack of seating in the lobby." Conversely, a reviewer for Fodor's said the hotel provided a "serene counterpoint to the mass of people, lights, and excitement that converge at the crossroads of Broadway and 42nd Street". A critic for Business Insider wrote in 2020: "It's comparable in price to other big brand hotels but offers a sleeker, more boutique vibe, with upscale rooms and five-star service." Visitors also praised the hotel's central location, large rooms, and rooftop bar, but criticized the fact that it lacked a pool and a spa.

See also 
 List of New York City Designated Landmarks in Manhattan from 14th to 59th Streets
 National Register of Historic Places listings in Manhattan from 14th to 59th Streets

References

Notes
Explanatory notes

Inflation figures

Citations

Sources

External links 

 
 Original floor plans (1902)

1906 establishments in New York City
Beaux-Arts architecture in New York City
Broadway (Manhattan)
Hotel buildings completed in 1906
Hotel buildings on the National Register of Historic Places in Manhattan
Hotels in Manhattan
Magazine headquarters
Mass media company headquarters in the United States
New York City Designated Landmarks in Manhattan
Office buildings in Manhattan
Times Square buildings
42nd Street (Manhattan)
Buildings with mansard roofs